State Road 6 (SR 6) is an east–west route in Madison and Hamilton Counties, running from U.S. Route 90 (US 90) east of Madison to US 129 in Jasper, the last five miles (8 km) concurrent with US 41.

County Road 6 (CR 6), a former section of SR 6, continues east from Jasper to US 441 in Columbia County.

Route description

State Road 6 begins at a fork in the road along US 90 east of Madison, where US 90 briefly becomes a two-lane divided highway as it curves to the southeast. SR 6 remains relatively straight as it intersects some county and local roads, such as CR 255 north of Lee, CR 414 (Old Blue Springs Road), and CR 413. East of the driveway to a Nestlé water bottling plant, it passes through Madison Blue Spring State Park. Crossing over the Withlacoochee River and thus the Madison-Hamilton County Line, SR 6 enters the Withlacoochee Tract of the Twin Rivers State Forest in Blue Springs, where it encounters an intersection with County Road 143, a county extension of State Road 143. The roads briefly overlap along the southern border of Blue Springs Longleaf Tract of the Twin River State Forest. The next community is Crossroads, where it intersects CR 141, which includes a driveway to the Cross Roads Motor Speedway that can be found on the southeast corner.

After the intersection with CR 751, SR 6 curves to the northeast, where it intersects only a few local streets and a power line right of way north of West 44th Street. Northeast of the eastern terminus of CR 146 it runs under a diamond interchange with Interstate 75 (I-75) at exit 460. From there it curve slightly towards the east again at the intersections of Northwest 38th Way and Southwest 78th Place, and then joins southbound US 41 (hidden SR 25), where both routes curve to the southeast and immediately run over a bridge over the Alapaha River. Here SR 6 and US 41 both continue to run southeast until CR 148 (Northwest 86th Boulevard), where they begin to curve straight east as they enter the City of Jasper, suddenly meeting an at-grade interchange with US 129/SR 100 From there, all routes run to the southeast again until they reach Fifth Avenue, where they move onto a local road named Hatley Street. In the heart of the city, the road approaches Central Avenue West and East, which has a former railroad right-of-way running between the two streets. Shortly after this, the multiplexes end as US 41/129 and SRs 25/100 turn south onto State Road 51(Second Avenue Southeast), which becomes County Road 51 north of this intersection, while State Road 6 becomes County Road 6 east of the same intersection, and maintains the name Hatley Street.

East of Jasper

Remaining a two lane rural route, CR 6 passes by the Jasper Public Library, before crossing a Georgia Southern and Florida Railway line, where it approaches a small industrial area. Outside of the city limits, the road intersects primarily local streets. The only intersection of any importance is Cypress Creek Road, which leads to its namesake Cypress Creek. The rest of the road winds through the forests of Northern Florida. The last intersection in the county is the slightly more important County Road 135 (Woodpecker Road), which also leads to Cypress Creek as well as Watson, northbound, as well as to White Springs southbound. As the road crosses over the Suwannee River, and thus the Hamilton-Columbia County Line, the name changes to Northwest Bay Creek Street, which remains straight northeast and southwest throughout the county. County Road 6 ends at US 441, south of the Florida-Georgia State Line.

Major intersections

See also
List of county roads in Hamilton County, Florida
List of county roads in Columbia County, Florida

References

External links

006
006
006
006
006
1945 establishments in Florida